The Dater Glacier is a steep valley glacier in Antarctica,  long and from  wide, flowing northeast in a sinuous course from the eastern slopes of the Vinson Massif between Sullivan Heights and Veregava Ridge to Rutford Ice Stream which borders the eastern flank of the Sentinel Range, Ellsworth Mountains. At the lower end the Dater Glacier coalesces with the terminus of the Ellen Glacier, the two emerging from the Sentinel Range as one stream just north of the Flowers Hills.

The glacier was discovered by U.S. Navy Squadron VX-6 on photographic flights of December 14–15, 1959, and mapped from these photographs by the United States Geological Survey. It was named by the Advisory Committee on Antarctic Names after Henry M. Dater, a historian on the staff of the U.S. Antarctic Projects Officer and the U.S. Naval Support Force Antarctica.

Tributary glaciers
 Hansen Glacier
 Berisad Glacier
 Orizari Glacier
 Hinkley Glacier
 Strinava Glacier

Maps
 Vinson Massif.  Scale 1:250 000 topographic map.  Reston, Virginia: US Geological Survey, 1988.
 Antarctic Digital Database (ADD). Scale 1:250000 topographic map of Antarctica. Scientific Committee on Antarctic Research (SCAR), 1993–2016.

See also
 List of glaciers in the Antarctic
 Glaciology

References
 

Glaciers of Ellsworth Land
Ellsworth Mountains